Tuskar Rock may refer to one of the following:

 Tuskar Rock, Ireland, an island off County Wexford
 Tuskar Rock air disaster at Tuskar Rock, Ireland, in 1968
 Tuskar Rock, a publishing imprint founded in 2008 by author Colm Tóibín and literary agent Peter Straus

See also
 Tusker Rock, Bristol Channel, Wales